John J. Pearce (13 May 1923 – 1992) was an Australian amateur tennis player who competed in the mid-20th century. He reached the quarterfinals of the Australian Championships in 1960 and 1961.

Pearce died in Scotland in 1992.

Grand Slam tournament finals

Mixed doubles (1 runner-up)

References

External links
 
 
 

1923 births
1992 deaths
20th-century Australian people
Australian male tennis players
Tennis people from New South Wales